R.Venkatapuram is a village in Rowthulapudi Mandal, Kakinada district in the state of Andhra Pradesh in India.

Geography 

Demographics 
 India census, R.Venkatapuram had a population of 301, out of which 160 were male and 141 were female. The population of children below 6 years of age was 30. The literacy rate of the village was 49.82%.

References 

Villages in Rowthulapudi mandal